The Kerenzerberg Tunnel is a motorway tunnel in Switzerland, and forms part of the A3 motorway from Basel and Zurich to Sargans.

The Kerenzerberg Tunnel is a one-way, unidirectional tunnel. Traffic from Zurich to Sargans must pass through the tunnel, whilst traffic in the opposite direction runs along the shores of the Walensee through six short tunnels originally built for a railway.

Transportation of dangerous goods through the Kerenzerberg tunnel is prohibited.

References

External links
 

Road tunnels in Switzerland
Buildings and structures in the canton of Glarus